Gulu may refer to:

 Gulu, a town in northern Uganda.
 Gulu District, in which the Ugandan town is located.
 Gulu Airport, serving Gulu town.
 Roman Catholic Archdiocese of Gulu
 Gulu Lalvani, founder and chairman of Binatone, a phone manufacturer.
 Gulu railway station on the Qingzang Railway in the Tibetan Autonomous Region of the People's Republic of China